Koroužné is a municipality and village in Žďár nad Sázavou District in the Vysočina Region of the Czech Republic. It has about 300 inhabitants.

Administrative parts
Villages of Kobylnice and Švařec are administrative parts of Koroužné.

References

Villages in Žďár nad Sázavou District